Shri Chaitanya Mahaprabhu is a 1954 Hindi devotional biopic film produced and directed by Vijay Bhatt. The film's music was composed by R. C. Boral, with lyrics by Bharat Vyas. The director of photography was V. N. Reddy. Bharat Bhushan won the Filmfare Award for Best Actor for his portrayal of Chaitanya Mahaprabhu. Asha Parekh, having started her career as a child artist in 1952, and who went on to become a famous actress, was cast in a small role in this film. The starcast included Bharat Bhushan, Durga Khote, Ameeta, Asha Parekh, Ram Mohan, Madan Puri, Kanhaiyalal and B.M. Vyas.

The film was about the 15th century "medieval Vaishnav poet saint" and social reformer of Bengal, Chaitanya Mahaprabhu, whom many considered an Avatar of Krishna. He was himself a Krishna devotee who is revered and worshipped even today.

Plot
Born under a Neem tree and hence also called Nimai, Vishvambar (Bharat Bhushan) is the second son of Jagannath Mishra and his wife Sachi Devi. Due to his fair colour, he is often referred to as Gaurang (Fair-coloured). The social milieu in the 15th century setting of the story is shown as being dismal, with hypocritical priests and oppressive rulers. He loses his father at an early age and the family faces hardships financially. Nimai completes his education and is an expert at debating with the local priests. He starts a school and marries Vishnupriya, daughter of Sanatan Misra who is the court priest. On his father's death anniversary he goes to Gaya to perform prayers for his father. There, he meets a saint called Ishvara Puri. He soon develops complete devotion to Krishna and starts chanting and singing his praises. His Radha and Krishna Bhakti (devotion) songs attract people from all walks of life. He takes renunciation and shaves his head. He settles in Puri, concentrating on his Bhakti and disappears while singing a bhajan. Dhananjay Bhattacharya sang in a wonderful and rich voice "Hari Hari Bol, Mukund Madhav Govind Bol".

Cast
 Durga Khote
 Bharat Bhushan as Vishvambhar Mishra / Chaitanya Mahaprabhu
 Ameeta
 Kanhaiyalal
 Madan Puri
 B. M. Vyas
 Krishna Kumari
 Sulochana Chatterji
 Umakant

Awards
Filmfare Award for Best Actor - Bharat Bhushan

Soundtrack
The music was directed by R. C. Boral and lyrics by Bharat Vyas. The playback singers of the 16 (one repeat) songs were Mohammed Rafi, Lata Mangeshkar, Asha Bhosle, Talat Mehmood, Binota Chakraborty, Dhananjay Bhattacharya.

Songlist

References

External links

1954 films
1950s Hindi-language films
Films directed by Vijay Bhatt
Hindu devotional films
Indian biographical films
1950s biographical films
Indian black-and-white films